This is a list of countries banning non-human ape experimentation. The term non-human ape here refers to all members of the superfamily Hominoidea, excluding Homo sapiens. Banning in this case refers to the enactment of formal decrees prohibiting experimentation on non-human apes, though often with exceptions for extreme scenarios.

Experimentation on great apes—a smaller family within the ape superfamily—is currently banned in the European Union, the United Kingdom, and New Zealand (29 countries total). These countries have ruled that chimpanzees, bonobos, gorillas and orangutans are so cognitively similar to humans that using them as test subjects is unethical. Austria is the only country in the world to have completely banned experiments on all apes, including both the great apes and the lesser apes, commonly known as gibbons.

Table of countries banning all non-human ape experimentation

Table of countries banning non-human great ape experimentation

See also
 Animal rights by country or territory
 Great ape personhood
 Great Ape Trust
 Declaration on Great Apes
 Great Ape Project
 List of animal rights advocates
 Project R&R: Release and Restitution for Chimpanzees in US Laboratories
 Animal liberation movement

Notes

References

External links
 ReleaseChimps.org

Animal testing
Animal rights
Anti-vivisection movement
Apes
Animal testing on non-human primates